Sani Abacha  (20 September 1943 – 8 June 1998) was a Nigerian military officer and politician who ruled as the military head of state after seizing power in 1993 until his death in 1998. Abacha's seizure of power was the last successful coup d'etat in the Nigerian military history. 

Abacha served as Chief of Army Staff from 1985 to 1990, as Chief of Defence Staff from 1990 to 1993, and as Minister of Defence. Abacha is noted for having been the first Nigerian Army officer to attain the rank of a full military general without skipping a single rank.

His rule saw the achievement of several economic feats and also recorded human rights abuses and several political assassinations. He has been dubbed a kleptocrat and a dictator by several modern commentators. He was succeeded as Nigeria's head of state by General Abdulsalami Abubakar.

Early life
Abacha was born and brought up in Kano. He attended the Nigerian Military Training College in Kaduna, and was commissioned in 1963 after he had attended the Mons Officer Cadet School in Aldershot, England.

Military career
Abacha was involved in all the military coups in Nigeria during his military career. In 1966, when he was still a second lieutenant with the 3rd Battalion in Kaduna, he took part in the July 1966 Nigerian counter-coup from the conceptual stage. He could well have been a participant in the Lagos or Abeokuta phases of the coup the previous January as well.
In 1969, he fought during the Nigerian Civil War as a platoon and battalion commander. He later became commander of the 2nd Infantry Division in 1975. In 1983, Abacha was general officer commanding of the 2nd Mechanised Division, and was appointed a member of the Supreme Military Council.

In 1983, Abacha played a prominent role in the 1983 Nigerian coup d'état which brought General Muhammadu Buhari to power; and the 1985 Nigerian coup d'etat which removed Buhari and brought General Ibrahim Babangida to power. When General Ibrahim Babangida was named President and Commander-in-Chief of the Armed Forces of the Federal Republic of Nigeria in 1985, Abacha was named Chief of Army Staff. He was later appointed Minister of Defence in 1990.

Seizure of power 

Abacha was the defence minister and most senior official within the military hierarchy during the crisis of the Third Republic. He orchestrated the coup d'etat of 1993 which overthrew the Interim National Government of Ernest Shonekan. In his nationwide broadcast, Abacha portrayed the overthrow as an act of stability brought about through the socio-political uncertainties caused by the 1993 presidential election.

Head of state 
Abacha ruled as Head of State and Commander-in-Chief of the Armed Forces of the Federal Republic of Nigeria from 1993 to 1998. In September 1994, he issued a decree that placed his government above the jurisdiction of the courts effectively giving him absolute power. Another decree gave him the right to detain anyone for up to three months without trial. He further abrogated Decree 691 of 1993.

Regime maintenance 
Abacha assembled a personal security force of 3,000 men trained in North Korea. Abacha's chief security officer Hamza al-Mustapha had an iron grip on the apparatus of military-security. the Nigeria Police Force underwent a large scale retraining. The state cracked down ruthlessly on criminals and dissidents, the National Democratic Coalition was attributed with several bombings across the country, and several members were arrested. 
When Moshood Abiola proclaimed himself president, he was jailed for treason and subsequently died in custody. Also, former military ruler Olusegun Obasanjo was jailed for treason and accused of plotting a coup together with General Oladipo Diya. In 1997, General Shehu Yar'Adua who was also jailed died in custody. Abacha's regime was accused of human rights abuses, especially after the hanging of Ogoni activist Ken Saro-Wiwa (only one of several executions of Ogoni activists opposed to the exploitation of Nigerian resources by the multinational petroleum company, Royal Dutch Shell), whose death later led to the eviction of Nigeria from the Commonwealth Nations. Wole Soyinka was charged in absentia with treason. Abacha's regime suffered opposition externally by pro-democracy activists.

National economy 
Abacha's administration oversaw an increase in the country's foreign exchange reserves from $494 million in 1993 to $9.6 billion by the middle of 1997, and reduced the external debt of Nigeria from $36 billion in 1993 to $27 billion by 1997. Abacha also constructed between 25 and 100 km of urban road in major cities such as Kano, Gusau, Benin, Funtua, Zaria, Enugu, Kaduna, Aba, Lagos, Lokoja and Port Harcourt. Abacha brought the privatisation programs of the Ibrahim Babangida administration to a halt, reduced an inflation rate of 54% inherited from Ernest Shonekan to 8.5% between 1993 and 1998, all while the nation's primary commodity, oil was at an average of $15 per barrel. GDP growth, despite being estimated to be higher than the 2.2% growth in 1995, was largely limited to the petroleum sector.

Embezzlement of state funds 
The unprecedented economic achievements coincided with the rapid expansion of embezzlement hitherto unseen in the history of corruption in Nigeria in the alleged saga known as "Abacha loot". Abacha's national security adviser, Alhaji Ismaila Gwarzo, was accused by the government of President Olusegun Obasanjo to have played a central role in the looting and transfer of money to overseas accounts. Abacha's son, Mohammed Abacha and best friend Alhaji Mohammed M. Sada were also involved. A preliminary report published by the Abdulsalam Abubakar transitional government in November 1998 described the process. The report mentioned that Sani Abacha told Ismaila Gwarzo to provide fake national security funding requests, which Abacha approved. The funds were usually sent in cash or travellers' cheques by the Central Bank of Nigeria to Gwarzo, who took them to Abacha's house. Mohammed Sada then arranged to launder the money to offshore accounts. An estimated $1.4 billion in cash was delivered in this way.

In 2004, a list of the ten most self-enriching leaders in the previous two decades was released; in order of amount allegedly stolen, the fourth-ranked of these was Abacha and his family who are alleged to have embezzled $1 billion – $5 billion. In 2002, false rumours circulated that Abacha's family purportedly agreed to return $1.2 billion. Sources in the Obasanjo administration disclosed that the whole Abacha loot was politicised by the administration for his re-election bid. On 7 August 2014, the United States Department of Justice announced the forfeiture of US$480 million, the largest in its history, to the Nigerian government. Jersey discovered more than $267 million dollars in funds that were allegedly laundered through the U.S. banking system and deposited in a Jersey account (£210m in British pounds). The U.S. Justice Department, Jersey courts and the government of Nigeria completed a civil asset forfeiture against the funds and they will be divided between those countries.

National politics 
{
  "type": "FeatureCollection",
  "features": [
    {
      "type": "Feature",
      "properties": {},
      "geometry": {
        "type": "Polygon",
        "coordinates": [
          [
            [
              9.7119140625,
              7.2534960500695
            ],
            [
              9.7119140625,
              7.1663003819032
            ],
            [
              9.68994140625,
              7.2099003143688
            ],
            [
              9.7998046875,
              7.4278365287383
            ],
            [
              9.580078125,
              6.6427829003562
            ],
            [
              9.77783203125,
              7.2316987083671
            ],
            [
              9.66796875,
              7.1444988496473
            ],
            [
              9.7998046875,
              7.4931964701223
            ],
            [
              9.7119140625,
              7.3842578283093
            ],
            [
              9.7998046875,
              7.2752923363722
            ],
            [
              9.73388671875,
              7.297087564172
            ],
            [
              9.84375,
              7.2316987083671
            ],
            [
              9.82177734375,
              7.3624668655358
            ],
            [
              9.77783203125,
              7.1008926686237
            ],
            [
              9.82177734375,
              7.0790880260717
            ],
            [
              9.73388671875,
              7.0136679275666
            ],
            [
              9.55810546875,
              7.1663003819032
            ],
            [
              9.84375,
              7.1008926686237
            ],
            [
              9.82177734375,
              7.1444988496473
            ],
            [
              9.7119140625,
              7.1663003819032
            ],
            [
              9.580078125,
              7.1444988496473
            ],
            [
              9.77783203125,
              7.1663003819032
            ],
            [
              9.64599609375,
              7.1444988496473
            ],
            [
              9.73388671875,
              7.2752923363722
            ],
            [
              9.60205078125,
              7.0790880260717
            ],
            [
              9.7119140625,
              6.8391696263428
            ],
            [
              9.7998046875,
              6.7737162387535
            ],
            [
              9.77783203125,
              6.9700494172962
            ],
            [
              9.55810546875,
              6.9918591814837
            ],
            [
              9.6240234375,
              6.9264268470596
            ],
            [
              9.580078125,
              7.1008926686237
            ],
            [
              9.580078125,
              7.1663003819032
            ],
            [
              9.66796875,
              7.0136679275666
            ],
            [
              9.84375,
              7.1226962775183
            ],
            [
              9.68994140625,
              7.1008926686237
            ],
            [
              9.6240234375,
              7.0790880260717
            ],
            [
              9.55810546875,
              7.1663003819032
            ],
            [
              9.898681640625,
              6.9264268470596
            ],
            [
              9.700927734375,
              6.8173528226221
            ],
            [
              9.656982421875,
              6.6427829003562
            ],
            [
              9.569091796875,
              6.5554746022019
            ],
            [
              9.437255859375,
              6.7518964648434
            ],
            [
              9.129638671875,
              6.7737162387535
            ],
            [
              8.887939453125,
              7.0136679275666
            ],
            [
              8.536376953125,
              6.9918591814837
            ],
            [
              8.470458984375,
              6.8609854337637
            ],
            [
              8.316650390625,
              6.8609854337637
            ],
            [
              8.074951171875,
              6.8828002417676
            ],
            [
              7.987060546875,
              6.7082539686715
            ],
            [
              7.899169921875,
              6.7082539686715
            ],
            [
              7.987060546875,
              6.9046140472381
            ],
            [
              7.833251953125,
              6.9264268470596
            ],
            [
              7.679443359375,
              6.948238638117
            ],
            [
              7.635498046875,
              7.0790880260717
            ],
            [
              7.547607421875,
              7.188100871179
            ],
            [
              7.305908203125,
              7.188100871179
            ],
            [
              7.086181640625,
              6.8828002417676
            ],
            [
              6.910400390625,
              6.9046140472381
            ],
            [
              6.756591796875,
              6.8391696263428
            ],
            [
              6.756591796875,
              6.7300757071092
            ],
            [
              6.668701171875,
              6.8609854337637
            ],
            [
              6.756591796875,
              7.0790880260717
            ],
            [
              6.778564453125,
              7.188100871179
            ],
            [
              6.778564453125,
              7.3188817303668
            ],
            [
              6.580810546875,
              7.3842578283093
            ],
            [
              6.383056640625,
              7.5585466060932
            ],
            [
              6.229248046875,
              7.5585466060932
            ],
            [
              6.119384765625,
              7.6674414827261
            ],
            [
              5.987548828125,
              7.7109916554332
            ],
            [
              5.899658203125,
              7.7980785313553
            ],
            [
              5.789794921875,
              7.8633818053092
            ],
            [
              5.767822265625,
              7.993957436359
            ],
            [
              5.679931640625,
              8.1462428250344
            ],
            [
              5.592041015625,
              8.1462428250344
            ],
            [
              5.372314453125,
              8.2114903234207
            ],
            [
              5.350341796875,
              8.1244912908612
            ],
            [
              5.130615234375,
              8.0157159978691
            ],
            [
              4.976806640625,
              8.1027385777832
            ],
            [
              4.779052734375,
              8.1027385777832
            ],
            [
              4.493408203125,
              8.2114903234207
            ],
            [
              4.361572265625,
              8.450638800331
            ],
            [
              4.295654296875,
              8.7765107160524
            ],
            [
              4.383544921875,
              9.0153023334206
            ],
            [
              4.207763671875,
              9.0587021563921
            ],
            [
              4.031982421875,
              9.1671787329767
            ],
            [
              3.834228515625,
              9.2756221767921
            ],
            [
              3.614501953125,
              9.1671787329767
            ],
            [
              3.394775390625,
              8.9067800075202
            ],
            [
              3.218994140625,
              8.9067800075202
            ],
            [
              2.955322265625,
              8.6896390681277
            ],
            [
              2.823486328125,
              8.7113588754265
            ],
            [
              2.823486328125,
              8.9284870626655
            ],
            [
              3.109130859375,
              9.0804001041553
            ],
            [
              3.218994140625,
              9.2539361568145
            ],
            [
              3.175048828125,
              9.4273866150324
            ],
            [
              3.394775390625,
              9.6657383951887
            ],
            [
              3.372802734375,
              9.7956775828297
            ],
            [
              3.636474609375,
              9.8389793755793
            ],
            [
              3.724365234375,
              10.120301632174
            ],
            [
              3.658447265625,
              10.336536087083
            ],
            [
              3.900146484375,
              10.444597722835
            ],
            [
              3.812255859375,
              10.854886268472
            ],
            [
              4.031982421875,
              10.962764256387
            ],
            [
              4.251708984375,
              10.854886268472
            ],
            [
              4.647216796875,
              10.854886268472
            ],
            [
              4.449462890625,
              10.574222078333
            ],
            [
              4.383544921875,
              10.271681232947
            ],
            [
              4.515380859375,
              10.055402736564
            ],
            [
              4.801025390625,
              10.120301632174
            ],
            [
              4.713134765625,
              10.271681232947
            ],
            [
              4.976806640625,
              10.206813072485
            ],
            [
              5.064697265625,
              10.358151400944
            ],
            [
              4.954833984375,
              10.509416700846
            ],
            [
              4.866943359375,
              10.61741806795
            ],
            [
              5.042724609375,
              10.682200600084
            ],
            [
              5.196533203125,
              10.811724143276
            ],
            [
              5.108642578125,
              10.898042159726
            ],
            [
              5.196533203125,
              11.070602913978
            ],
            [
              4.801025390625,
              11.199956869622
            ],
            [
              4.932861328125,
              11.307707707765
            ],
            [
              5.262451171875,
              11.199956869622
            ],
            [
              5.306396484375,
              11.329253026617
            ],
            [
              5.372314453125,
              10.984335146102
            ],
            [
              5.592041015625,
              10.919617760255
            ],
            [
              5.899658203125,
              10.984335146102
            ],
            [
              6.009521484375,
              11.070602913978
            ],
            [
              6.097412109375,
              10.919617760255
            ],
            [
              6.031494140625,
              10.61741806795
            ],
            [
              6.053466796875,
              10.487811882057
            ],
            [
              6.185302734375,
              10.358151400944
            ],
            [
              6.448974609375,
              10.509416700846
            ],
            [
              6.646728515625,
              10.487811882057
            ],
            [
              6.822509765625,
              10.552621801949
            ],
            [
              6.932373046875,
              10.336536087083
            ],
            [
              6.866455078125,
              10.098670120603
            ],
            [
              6.976318359375,
              9.9688506085461
            ],
            [
              7.152099609375,
              9.9904908030703
            ],
            [
              7.196044921875,
              9.7740245658647
            ],
            [
              7.174072265625,
              9.5357489981336
            ],
            [
              7.174072265625,
              9.3623528220556
            ],
            [
              7.459716796875,
              9.2756221767921
            ],
            [
              7.635498046875,
              9.3623528220556
            ],
            [
              7.767333984375,
              9.1888700844734
            ],
            [
              7.921142578125,
              9.2973068563276
            ],
            [
              8.074951171875,
              9.123792057074
            ],
            [
              8.360595703125,
              9.1671787329767
            ],
            [
              8.536376953125,
              8.99360046428
            ],
            [
              8.690185546875,
              9.0804001041553
            ],
            [
              8.778076171875,
              9.2973068563276
            ],
            [
              8.668212890625,
              9.6007499322469
            ],
            [
              8.778076171875,
              9.903921416775
            ],
            [
              8.778076171875,
              10.271681232947
            ],
            [
              8.909912109375,
              10.250059987303
            ],
            [
              8.997802734375,
              9.9904908030703
            ],
            [
              9.129638671875,
              9.9904908030703
            ],
            [
              9.239501953125,
              9.7090570686182
            ],
            [
              9.547119140625,
              9.4707356741309
            ],
            [
              9.744873046875,
              9.4707356741309
            ],
            [
              9.964599609375,
              9.6007499322469
            ],
            [
              10.030517578125,
              9.7307143057569
            ],
            [
              10.338134765625,
              9.5790843358825
            ],
            [
              10.513916015625,
              9.3623528220556
            ],
            [
              10.513916015625,
              9.2105601076297
            ],
            [
              10.360107421875,
              9.0587021563921
            ],
            [
              10.162353515625,
              8.8633620335517
            ],
            [
              10.074462890625,
              8.6461956811819
            ],
            [
              9.744873046875,
              8.5158355612022
            ],
            [
              9.635009765625,
              8.4723722829091
            ],
            [
              9.547119140625,
              8.4289040928754
            ],
            [
              9.349365234375,
              8.3636926518358
            ],
            [
              9.283447265625,
              8.2114903234207
            ],
            [
              9.393310546875,
              8.1027385777832
            ],
            [
              9.261474609375,
              7.9721977143869
            ],
            [
              9.085693359375,
              7.9069116164693
            ],
            [
              9.261474609375,
              7.8198474261926
            ],
            [
              9.635009765625,
              7.8198474261926
            ],
            [
              9.700927734375,
              7.6892171277362
            ],
            [
              9.832763671875,
              7.5149809423959
            ],
            [
              9.788818359375,
              7.188100871179
            ],
            [
              9.656982421875,
              7.0572823529716
            ],
            [
              9.613037109375,
              6.8828002417676
            ],
            [
              9.7119140625,
              7.2534960500695
            ]
          ]
        ]
      }
    },
    {
      "type": "Feature",
      "properties": {},
      "geometry": {
        "type": "Point",
        "coordinates": [
          6.514892578125,
          9.0153023334206
        ]
      }
    },
    {
      "type": "Feature",
      "properties": {},
      "geometry": {
        "type": "Polygon",
        "coordinates": [
          [
            [
              9.437255859375,
              7.8851472834243
            ],
            [
              9.547119140625,
              8.0592296272002
            ],
            [
              9.459228515625,
              8.2549827048779
            ],
            [
              9.766845703125,
              8.3636926518358
            ],
            [
              10.184326171875,
              8.4941045375519
            ],
            [
              10.272216796875,
              8.7330774212116
            ],
            [
              10.535888671875,
              8.885071663469
            ],
            [
              10.711669921875,
              9.1020967387265
            ],
            [
              10.623779296875,
              9.4057100416
            ],
            [
              10.865478515625,
              9.5574173568413
            ],
            [
              10.601806640625,
              9.6224141429248
            ],
            [
              10.294189453125,
              9.7090570686182
            ],
            [
              10.096435546875,
              9.8389793755793
            ],
            [
              9.920654296875,
              9.7956775828297
            ],
            [
              9.744873046875,
              9.6873984307606
            ],
            [
              9.591064453125,
              9.7090570686182
            ],
            [
              9.393310546875,
              9.8173291870678
            ],
            [
              9.327392578125,
              10.077037154405
            ],
            [
              9.173583984375,
              10.206813072485
            ],
            [
              8.975830078125,
              10.358151400944
            ],
            [
              8.887939453125,
              10.531020008465
            ],
            [
              8.931884765625,
              10.768555807732
            ],
            [
              8.887939453125,
              10.984335146102
            ],
            [
              9.063720703125,
              11.135287077054
            ],
            [
              9.261474609375,
              11.264612212504
            ],
            [
              9.503173828125,
              11.178401873712
            ],
            [
              9.744873046875,
              11.178401873712
            ],
            [
              9.898681640625,
              10.941191793457
            ],
            [
              10.206298828125,
              10.919617760255
            ],
            [
              10.382080078125,
              11.027472194118
            ],
            [
              10.491943359375,
              11.221510260011
            ],
            [
              10.360107421875,
              11.286160768753
            ],
            [
              10.140380859375,
              11.350796722384
            ],
            [
              10.008544921875,
              11.415418041941
            ],
            [
              9.942626953125,
              11.587669416896
            ],
            [
              9.898681640625,
              11.781325296112
            ],
            [
              9.744873046875,
              11.824341483849
            ],
            [
              9.964599609375,
              11.931852326961
            ],
            [
              10.162353515625,
              11.974844752932
            ],
            [
              10.272216796875,
              12.14674581454
            ],
            [
              10.360107421875,
              12.340001834116
            ],
            [
              10.601806640625,
              12.382928338487
            ],
            [
              10.733642578125,
              12.597454504832
            ],
            [
              10.689697265625,
              12.747516274953
            ],
            [
              10.579833984375,
              12.897489183756
            ],
            [
              10.426025390625,
              12.961735843534
            ],
            [
              10.250244140625,
              13.090179355734
            ],
            [
              10.074462890625,
              12.983147716797
            ],
            [
              9.788818359375,
              12.854648905589
            ],
            [
              10.052490234375,
              13.175771224423
            ],
            [
              10.382080078125,
              13.239945499286
            ],
            [
              10.821533203125,
              13.325484885598
            ],
            [
              11.260986328125,
              13.325484885598
            ],
            [
              11.678466796875,
              13.304102866767
            ],
            [
              12.008056640625,
              13.154376055419
            ],
            [
              12.425537109375,
              12.983147716797
            ],
            [
              12.667236328125,
              13.132979019087
            ],
            [
              12.864990234375,
              13.325484885598
            ],
            [
              13.150634765625,
              13.475105944335
            ],
            [
              13.370361328125,
              13.603278132529
            ],
            [
              13.634033203125,
              13.624633438236
            ],
            [
              13.875732421875,
              13.389619591748
            ],
            [
              14.139404296875,
              12.876069959947
            ],
            [
              14.139404296875,
              12.382928338487
            ],
            [
              14.512939453125,
              12.275598890562
            ],
            [
              14.556884765625,
              12.103780891646
            ],
            [
              14.556884765625,
              11.910353555774
            ],
            [
              14.644775390625,
              11.587669416896
            ],
            [
              14.249267578125,
              11.307707707765
            ],
            [
              13.985595703125,
              11.350796722384
            ],
            [
              13.765869140625,
              11.049038346537
            ],
            [
              13.634033203125,
              10.854886268472
            ],
            [
              13.480224609375,
              10.595820834654
            ],
            [
              13.502197265625,
              10.271681232947
            ],
            [
              13.282470703125,
              10.185187409269
            ],
            [
              13.172607421875,
              9.8389793755793
            ],
            [
              13.282470703125,
              9.7090570686182
            ],
            [
              13.172607421875,
              9.6224141429248
            ],
            [
              12.843017578125,
              9.4924081537655
            ],
            [
              12.843017578125,
              9.2322487994187
            ],
            [
              12.821044921875,
              8.9067800075202
            ],
            [
              12.689208984375,
              8.7765107160524
            ],
            [
              12.557373046875,
              8.7330774212116
            ],
            [
              12.381591796875,
              8.7547947024356
            ],
            [
              12.403564453125,
              8.537565350804
            ],
            [
              12.227783203125,
              8.5158355612022
            ],
            [
              12.249755859375,
              8.276727101164
            ],
            [
              12.139892578125,
              8.1027385777832
            ],
            [
              12.139892578125,
              7.8851472834243
            ],
            [
              12.030029296875,
              7.7980785313553
            ],
            [
              11.964111328125,
              7.6021078747029
            ],
            [
              11.854248046875,
              7.4496242601978
            ],
            [
              11.854248046875,
              7.2099003143688
            ],
            [
              11.700439453125,
              7.1226962775183
            ],
            [
              11.458740234375,
              6.9700494172962
            ],
            [
              11.568603515625,
              6.7518964648434
            ],
            [
              11.392822265625,
              6.6209572703263
            ],
            [
              11.195068359375,
              6.6209572703263
            ],
            [
              11.129150390625,
              6.7955350257195
            ],
            [
              10.997314453125,
              6.7518964648434
            ],
            [
              10.865478515625,
              6.8609854337637
            ],
            [
              10.887451171875,
              7.035475652433
            ],
            [
              10.689697265625,
              7.1663003819032
            ],
            [
              10.579833984375,
              7.2752923363722
            ],
            [
              10.469970703125,
              6.9264268470596
            ],
            [
              10.316162109375,
              6.948238638117
            ],
            [
              10.118408203125,
              7.1008926686237
            ],
            [
              9.986572265625,
              6.9918591814837
            ],
            [
              9.898681640625,
              7.1226962775183
            ],
            [
              9.964599609375,
              7.297087564172
            ],
            [
              9.942626953125,
              7.5585466060932
            ],
            [
              9.810791015625,
              7.7980785313553
            ],
            [
              9.700927734375,
              7.8851472834243
            ],
            [
              9.437255859375,
              7.8851472834243
            ]
          ]
        ]
      }
    },
    {
      "type": "Feature",
      "properties": {},
      "geometry": {
        "type": "Point",
        "coordinates": [
          11.590576171875,
          10.595820834654
        ]
      }
    },
    {
      "type": "Feature",
      "properties": {},
      "geometry": {
        "type": "Polygon",
        "coordinates": [
          [
            [
              4.119873046875,
              13.453737213419
            ],
            [
              4.339599609375,
              13.496472765759
            ],
            [
              4.515380859375,
              13.645986814875
            ],
            [
              4.888916015625,
              13.752724664397
            ],
            [
              5.086669921875,
              13.752724664397
            ],
            [
              5.262451171875,
              13.752724664397
            ],
            [
              5.526123046875,
              13.880745842026
            ],
            [
              6.119384765625,
              13.624633438236
            ],
            [
              6.405029296875,
              13.603278132529
            ],
            [
              6.844482421875,
              13.111580118252
            ],
            [
              7.042236328125,
              12.940322128385
            ],
            [
              7.239990234375,
              13.068776734358
            ],
            [
              7.415771484375,
              13.068776734358
            ],
            [
              7.833251953125,
              13.282718960896
            ],
            [
              8.162841796875,
              13.218555949175
            ],
            [
              8.360595703125,
              13.00455774534
            ],
            [
              8.558349609375,
              13.047372256949
            ],
            [
              8.690185546875,
              12.876069959947
            ],
            [
              8.953857421875,
              12.811801316583
            ],
            [
              9.722900390625,
              12.726084296948
            ],
            [
              9.942626953125,
              12.726084296948
            ],
            [
              10.140380859375,
              12.91890657418
            ],
            [
              10.294189453125,
              12.811801316583
            ],
            [
              10.557861328125,
              12.683214911819
            ],
            [
              10.426025390625,
              12.533115357277
            ],
            [
              10.228271484375,
              12.533115357277
            ],
            [
              10.074462890625,
              12.125264218332
            ],
            [
              9.678955078125,
              11.931852326961
            ],
            [
              9.613037109375,
              11.759814674442
            ],
            [
              9.788818359375,
              11.630715737981
            ],
            [
              9.920654296875,
              11.415418041941
            ],
            [
              10.316162109375,
              11.178401873712
            ],
            [
              10.140380859375,
              11.178401873712
            ],
            [
              10.140380859375,
              11.070602913978
            ],
            [
              9.986572265625,
              11.092165893502
            ],
            [
              9.898681640625,
              11.243062041948
            ],
            [
              9.700927734375,
              11.307707707765
            ],
            [
              9.591064453125,
              11.307707707765
            ],
            [
              9.327392578125,
              11.436955216143
            ],
            [
              9.107666015625,
              11.393879232967
            ],
            [
              8.887939453125,
              11.286160768753
            ],
            [
              8.756103515625,
              11.135287077054
            ],
            [
              8.756103515625,
              10.854886268472
            ],
            [
              8.843994140625,
              10.703791711681
            ],
            [
              8.690185546875,
              10.574222078333
            ],
            [
              8.756103515625,
              10.336536087083
            ],
            [
              8.624267578125,
              10.141931686131
            ],
            [
              8.602294921875,
              9.947208977327
            ],
            [
              8.602294921875,
              9.7523701391733
            ],
            [
              8.646240234375,
              9.4490618268814
            ],
            [
              8.602294921875,
              9.2105601076297
            ],
            [
              8.448486328125,
              9.2756221767921
            ],
            [
              8.250732421875,
              9.2756221767921
            ],
            [
              7.987060546875,
              9.4273866150324
            ],
            [
              7.877197265625,
              9.4057100416
            ],
            [
              7.701416015625,
              9.5574173568413
            ],
            [
              7.525634765625,
              9.5140792627709
            ],
            [
              7.349853515625,
              9.5357489981336
            ],
            [
              7.371826171875,
              9.8606281453659
            ],
            [
              7.349853515625,
              10.141931686131
            ],
            [
              7.152099609375,
              10.120301632174
            ],
            [
              7.020263671875,
              10.16356027949
            ],
            [
              7.064208984375,
              10.444597722835
            ],
            [
              6.932373046875,
              10.61741806795
            ],
            [
              6.690673828125,
              10.703791711681
            ],
            [
              6.405029296875,
              10.682200600084
            ],
            [
              6.207275390625,
              10.531020008465
            ],
            [
              6.163330078125,
              10.660607953625
            ],
            [
              6.229248046875,
              10.941191793457
            ],
            [
              6.009521484375,
              11.199956869622
            ],
            [
              5.767822265625,
              11.113727282173
            ],
            [
              5.570068359375,
              11.092165893502
            ],
            [
              5.460205078125,
              11.372338792141
            ],
            [
              5.328369140625,
              11.480024648556
            ],
            [
              5.240478515625,
              11.372338792141
            ],
            [
              5.042724609375,
              11.393879232967
            ],
            [
              4.757080078125,
              11.372338792141
            ],
            [
              4.691162109375,
              11.199956869622
            ],
            [
              4.801025390625,
              11.135287077054
            ],
            [
              5.086669921875,
              11.070602913978
            ],
            [
              5.020751953125,
              10.962764256387
            ],
            [
              4.998779296875,
              10.833305983642
            ],
            [
              4.866943359375,
              10.811724143276
            ],
            [
              4.822998046875,
              10.595820834654
            ],
            [
              4.954833984375,
              10.466205555064
            ],
            [
              4.976806640625,
              10.314919285813
            ],
            [
              4.822998046875,
              10.401377554544
            ],
            [
              4.669189453125,
              10.401377554544
            ],
            [
              4.625244140625,
              10.271681232947
            ],
            [
              4.691162109375,
              10.185187409269
            ],
            [
              4.515380859375,
              10.336536087083
            ],
            [
              4.559326171875,
              10.531020008465
            ],
            [
              4.691162109375,
              10.682200600084
            ],
            [
              4.735107421875,
              10.898042159726
            ],
            [
              4.625244140625,
              11.027472194118
            ],
            [
              4.471435546875,
              11.027472194118
            ],
            [
              4.273681640625,
              11.092165893502
            ],
            [
              4.075927734375,
              11.135287077054
            ],
            [
              3.878173828125,
              11.070602913978
            ],
            [
              3.768310546875,
              11.286160768753
            ],
            [
              3.592529296875,
              11.415418041941
            ],
            [
              3.614501953125,
              11.566143767763
            ],
            [
              3.834228515625,
              11.824341483849
            ],
            [
              3.724365234375,
              11.910353555774
            ],
            [
              3.790283203125,
              12.082295837364
            ],
            [
              3.768310546875,
              12.232654837013
            ],
            [
              3.746337890625,
              12.468760144823
            ],
            [
              4.053955078125,
              12.640338306847
            ],
            [
              4.163818359375,
              12.811801316583
            ],
            [
              4.185791015625,
              13.132979019087
            ],
            [
              4.119873046875,
              13.453737213419
            ]
          ]
        ]
      }
    },
    {
      "type": "Feature",
      "properties": {},
      "geometry": {
        "type": "Point",
        "coordinates": [
          6.492919921875,
          11.824341483849
        ]
      }
    },
    {
      "type": "Feature",
      "properties": {},
      "geometry": {
        "type": "Polygon",
        "coordinates": [
          [
            [
              8.250732421875,
              6.1405547824503
            ],
            [
              8.382568359375,
              6.4681510126642
            ],
            [
              8.294677734375,
              6.7300757071092
            ],
            [
              8.206787109375,
              6.686431252652
            ],
            [
              8.074951171875,
              6.6209572703263
            ],
            [
              7.987060546875,
              6.5336451305675
            ],
            [
              7.789306640625,
              6.6209572703263
            ],
            [
              7.833251953125,
              6.7737162387535
            ],
            [
              7.635498046875,
              6.8391696263428
            ],
            [
              7.503662109375,
              6.9918591814837
            ],
            [
              7.349853515625,
              6.9918591814837
            ],
            [
              7.261962890625,
              6.8173528226221
            ],
            [
              6.976318359375,
              6.7737162387535
            ],
            [
              6.910400390625,
              6.6427829003562
            ],
            [
              6.800537109375,
              6.5118147063479
            ],
            [
              6.734619140625,
              6.4026484059639
            ],
            [
              6.822509765625,
              6.1624009215266
            ],
            [
              6.756591796875,
              5.8783321096743
            ],
            [
              6.756591796875,
              5.7034479821495
            ],
            [
              6.690673828125,
              5.5722498011139
            ],
            [
              6.822509765625,
              5.550380568998
            ],
            [
              6.866455078125,
              5.3535213553373
            ],
            [
              7.108154296875,
              5.2878874140113
            ],
            [
              7.261962890625,
              5.2878874140113
            ],
            [
              7.371826171875,
              5.1347146340145
            ],
            [
              7.218017578125,
              4.959615024698
            ],
            [
              7.437744140625,
              4.8939406089021
            ],
            [
              7.503662109375,
              5.1347146340145
            ],
            [
              7.525634765625,
              5.3316441534398
            ],
            [
              7.613525390625,
              5.4628955602096
            ],
            [
              7.745361328125,
              5.6378525987709
            ],
            [
              7.899169921875,
              5.5066396743549
            ],
            [
              7.855224609375,
              5.7471740766514
            ],
            [
              7.921142578125,
              5.9438995794256
            ],
            [
              7.987060546875,
              6.075011000682
            ],
            [
              8.162841796875,
              6.075011000682
            ],
            [
              8.250732421875,
              6.1405547824503
            ]
          ]
        ]
      }
    },
    {
      "type": "Feature",
      "properties": {},
      "geometry": {
        "type": "Point",
        "coordinates": [
          7.393798828125,
          6.2716180643149
        ]
      }
    },
    {
      "type": "Feature",
      "properties": {},
      "geometry": {
        "type": "Polygon",
        "coordinates": [
          [
            [
              8.492431640625,
              6.6646075621726
            ],
            [
              8.690185546875,
              6.7300757071092
            ],
            [
              8.734130859375,
              6.8609854337637
            ],
            [
              9.019775390625,
              6.7955350257195
            ],
            [
              8.975830078125,
              6.6209572703263
            ],
            [
              9.217529296875,
              6.5991306752072
            ],
            [
              9.415283203125,
              6.5336451305675
            ],
            [
              9.327392578125,
              6.4463177494576
            ],
            [
              9.151611328125,
              6.2279339302687
            ],
            [
              8.997802734375,
              6.075011000682
            ],
            [
              8.822021484375,
              5.9876068916583
            ],
            [
              8.778076171875,
              5.6815836834211
            ],
            [
              8.887939453125,
              5.5066396743549
            ],
            [
              8.800048828125,
              5.2878874140113
            ],
            [
              8.624267578125,
              4.9377242743025
            ],
            [
              8.470458984375,
              4.7844689665794
            ],
            [
              8.316650390625,
              4.8939406089021
            ],
            [
              8.184814453125,
              5.0252829086093
            ],
            [
              8.096923828125,
              4.8939406089021
            ],
            [
              8.1436157226563,
              4.9103598205323
            ],
            [
              8.2150268554688,
              4.828259746867
            ],
            [
              8.2754516601563,
              4.7844689665794
            ],
            [
              8.3084106445313,
              4.7242520745233
            ],
            [
              8.3193969726563,
              4.6421297143085
            ],
            [
              8.2754516601563,
              4.5764249358537
            ],
            [
              8.1765747070313,
              4.5764249358537
            ],
            [
              7.9019165039063,
              4.5435702793718
            ],
            [
              7.6712036132813,
              4.5107141256985
            ],
            [
              7.5942993164063,
              4.5326183939718
            ],
            [
              7.5558471679688,
              4.4833328616955
            ],
            [
              7.4240112304688,
              4.4614271114421
            ],
            [
              7.2894287109375,
              4.4449973697273
            ],
            [
              7.1575927734375,
              4.5107141256985
            ],
            [
              7.1136474609375,
              4.4888091967787
            ],
            [
              6.9708251953125,
              4.4230904779609
            ],
            [
              6.6851806640625,
              4.4011829382783
            ],
            [
              6.4874267578125,
              4.3464112753332
            ],
            [
              6.1798095703125,
              4.3135463640685
            ],
            [
              5.9600830078125,
              4.3573659279002
            ],
            [
              5.7513427734375,
              4.5435702793718
            ],
            [
              5.5975341796875,
              4.6968790268714
            ],
            [
              5.5206298828125,
              4.8501540785057
            ],
            [
              5.4217529296875,
              5.0800010938086
            ],
            [
              5.5426025390625,
              5.1784820885229
            ],
            [
              5.4766845703125,
              5.1784820885229
            ],
            [
              5.4107666015625,
              5.1347146340145
            ],
            [
              5.3668212890625,
              5.2769477448699
            ],
            [
              5.5755615234375,
              5.3972734076909
            ],
            [
              5.6524658203125,
              5.550380568998
            ],
            [
              5.5645751953125,
              5.5394456485468
            ],
            [
              5.4986572265625,
              5.4628955602096
            ],
            [
              5.2789306640625,
              5.4738318891928
            ],
            [
              5.2349853515625,
              5.5613152866518
            ],
            [
              5.5426025390625,
              5.6050521214048
            ],
            [
              5.4876708984375,
              5.6815836834211
            ],
            [
              5.3778076171875,
              5.6706512225666
            ],
            [
              5.2239990234375,
              5.6378525987709
            ],
            [
              5.1470947265625,
              5.7471740766514
            ],
            [
              5.2349853515625,
              5.8674034445987
            ],
            [
              5.2459716796875,
              5.9329722079457
            ],
            [
              5.1690673828125,
              5.9111168156317
            ],
            [
              5.0811767578125,
              5.8346161656101
            ],
            [
              5.0042724609375,
              5.9220446198833
            ],
            [
              5.1361083984375,
              6.1733236540151
            ],
            [
              5.0482177734375,
              6.3043787643258
            ],
            [
              5.2020263671875,
              6.5227300373354
            ],
            [
              5.1361083984375,
              6.6427829003562
            ],
            [
              5.1470947265625,
              6.7300757071092
            ],
            [
              5.2569580078125,
              6.7628064749715
            ],
            [
              5.2899169921875,
              6.8828002417676
            ],
            [
              5.5206298828125,
              6.8937072700142
            ],
            [
              5.5096435546875,
              6.8282613488251
            ],
            [
              5.5645751953125,
              6.7082539686715
            ],
            [
              5.6414794921875,
              6.6973427326644
            ],
            [
              5.7733154296875,
              6.7628064749715
            ],
            [
              5.8282470703125,
              6.959144154386
            ],
            [
              5.8392333984375,
              7.0463791309377
            ],
            [
              5.9381103515625,
              7.1663003819032
            ],
            [
              5.9381103515625,
              7.2861900827788
            ],
            [
              6.0260009765625,
              7.3624668655358
            ],
            [
              5.9710693359375,
              7.4931964701223
            ],
            [
              6.0919189453125,
              7.5585466060932
            ],
            [
              6.0919189453125,
              7.4278365287383
            ],
            [
              6.1688232421875,
              7.4278365287383
            ],
            [
              6.2896728515625,
              7.482303825233
            ],
            [
              6.3336181640625,
              7.3951529071373
            ],
            [
              6.4324951171875,
              7.3951529071373
            ],
            [
              6.4984130859375,
              7.3079847801639
            ],
            [
              6.5313720703125,
              7.2534960500695
            ],
            [
              6.6192626953125,
              7.2752923363722
            ],
            [
              6.7181396484375,
              7.1663003819032
            ],
            [
              6.6741943359375,
              7.0681853181458
            ],
            [
              6.6082763671875,
              6.8391696263428
            ],
            [
              6.6522216796875,
              6.7191649602832
            ],
            [
              6.6412353515625,
              6.5336451305675
            ],
            [
              6.6522216796875,
              6.3917304854815
            ],
            [
              6.7510986328125,
              6.1842461612806
            ],
            [
              6.7071533203125,
              6.075011000682
            ],
            [
              6.6082763671875,
              5.8346161656101
            ],
            [
              6.6192626953125,
              5.6815836834211
            ],
            [
              6.6412353515625,
              5.5175752008306
            ],
            [
              6.7071533203125,
              5.4628955602096
            ],
            [
              6.7291259765625,
              5.2988268898344
            ],
            [
              6.8939208984375,
              5.2003646811835
            ],
            [
              7.0367431640625,
              5.2222465132274
            ],
            [
              7.2564697265625,
              5.1675405079505
            ],
            [
              7.2454833984375,
              5.0800010938086
            ],
            [
              7.1685791015625,
              4.9815050493282
            ],
            [
              7.1575927734375,
              4.8939406089021
            ],
            [
              7.2894287109375,
              4.8829942439049
            ],
            [
              7.4102783203125,
              4.86110097831
            ],
            [
              7.5201416015625,
              4.8501540785057
            ],
            [
              7.5421142578125,
              5.0033943450221
            ],
            [
              7.6080322265625,
              5.1456567803005
            ],
            [
              7.5860595703125,
              5.2988268898344
            ],
            [
              7.6629638671875,
              5.3207052599439
            ],
            [
              7.6629638671875,
              5.4082109285908
            ],
            [
              7.7398681640625,
              5.4847680181413
            ],
            [
              7.8936767578125,
              5.3753977744747
            ],
            [
              7.9925537109375,
              5.3535213553373
            ],
            [
              7.9486083984375,
              5.550380568998
            ],
            [
              7.9376220703125,
              5.7143798192353
            ],
            [
              8.0035400390625,
              5.8564745653005
            ],
            [
              8.0035400390625,
              5.9876068916583
            ],
            [
              8.2012939453125,
              5.9438995794256
            ],
            [
              8.2891845703125,
              6.020385082456
            ],
            [
              8.3221435546875,
              6.1405547824503
            ],
            [
              8.4429931640625,
              6.2388553055363
            ],
            [
              8.4320068359375,
              6.3371373949885
            ],
            [
              8.5308837890625,
              6.4463177494576
            ],
            [
              8.3551025390625,
              6.6973427326644
            ],
            [
              8.492431640625,
              6.6646075621726
            ]
          ]
        ]
      }
    },
    {
      "type": "Feature",
      "properties": {},
      "geometry": {
        "type": "Point",
        "coordinates": [
          6.2457275390625,
          5.4300853769993
        ]
      }
    },
    {
      "type": "Feature",
      "properties": {},
      "geometry": {
        "type": "Polygon",
        "coordinates": [
          [
            [
              2.8179931640625,
              8.5918844057982
            ],
            [
              2.9608154296875,
              8.60274728477
            ],
            [
              3.1585693359375,
              8.7439362200841
            ],
            [
              3.2794189453125,
              8.7765107160524
            ],
            [
              3.7188720703125,
              8.9284870626655
            ],
            [
              3.7738037109375,
              9.1346392217168
            ],
            [
              3.9056396484375,
              9.1563325600468
            ],
            [
              4.0045166015625,
              9.0261527791461
            ],
            [
              4.1802978515625,
              8.971897294083
            ],
            [
              4.2901611328125,
              8.971897294083
            ],
            [
              4.1802978515625,
              8.8633620335517
            ],
            [
              4.1693115234375,
              8.7439362200841
            ],
            [
              4.3560791015625,
              8.3093414439176
            ],
            [
              4.4439697265625,
              8.157118149072
            ],
            [
              4.5977783203125,
              8.0918617801147
            ],
            [
              4.8065185546875,
              8.0483516575395
            ],
            [
              4.9822998046875,
              8.0483516575395
            ],
            [
              5.1251220703125,
              7.961317419189
            ],
            [
              5.2679443359375,
              7.9721977143869
            ],
            [
              5.4327392578125,
              8.0483516575395
            ],
            [
              5.5096435546875,
              8.0265948424896
            ],
            [
              5.6085205078125,
              8.0265948424896
            ],
            [
              5.5535888671875,
              7.8633818053092
            ],
            [
              5.6854248046875,
              7.7980785313553
            ],
            [
              5.7843017578125,
              7.7654230661722
            ],
            [
              5.8502197265625,
              7.645664723491
            ],
            [
              5.9710693359375,
              7.5694373362514
            ],
            [
              5.9161376953125,
              7.4278365287383
            ],
            [
              5.9161376953125,
              7.351570982365
            ],
            [
              5.8502197265625,
              7.1226962775183
            ],
            [
              5.7733154296875,
              7.0681853181458
            ],
            [
              5.7623291015625,
              6.8500776547855
            ],
            [
              5.6744384765625,
              6.8173528226221
            ],
            [
              5.6304931640625,
              6.8173528226221
            ],
            [
              5.5755615234375,
              6.948238638117
            ],
            [
              5.2020263671875,
              6.9046140472381
            ],
            [
              5.1470947265625,
              6.8173528226221
            ],
            [
              5.0262451171875,
              6.8064440481237
            ],
            [
              5.0701904296875,
              6.6973427326644
            ],
            [
              5.1031494140625,
              6.5663889798223
            ],
            [
              5.1361083984375,
              6.479067290763
            ],
            [
              5.0262451171875,
              6.4026484059639
            ],
            [
              4.9822998046875,
              6.31529853833
            ],
            [
              5.0372314453125,
              6.2388553055363
            ],
            [
              5.0921630859375,
              6.1842461612806
            ],
            [
              4.9822998046875,
              5.9985331743293
            ],
            [
              4.8065185546875,
              6.1405547824503
            ],
            [
              4.5758056640625,
              6.293458760394
            ],
            [
              4.4879150390625,
              6.3917304854815
            ],
            [
              4.3780517578125,
              6.4244835461807
            ],
            [
              4.2791748046875,
              6.5118147063479
            ],
            [
              4.2352294921875,
              6.6646075621726
            ],
            [
              4.1253662109375,
              6.6318702061727
            ],
            [
              4.0594482421875,
              6.7300757071092
            ],
            [
              3.8836669921875,
              6.6973427326644
            ],
            [
              3.9825439453125,
              6.500899137996
            ],
            [
              3.7628173828125,
              6.500899137996
            ],
            [
              3.4661865234375,
              6.500899137996
            ],
            [
              3.1365966796875,
              6.4899833326707
            ],
            [
              2.8070068359375,
              6.4463177494576
            ],
            [
              2.7960205078125,
              6.6209572703263
            ],
            [
              2.7960205078125,
              6.7518964648434
            ],
            [
              2.7410888671875,
              6.9264268470596
            ],
            [
              2.7850341796875,
              7.0681853181458
            ],
            [
              2.7410888671875,
              7.3842578283093
            ],
            [
              2.8729248046875,
              7.482303825233
            ],
            [
              2.7630615234375,
              7.62388685312
            ],
            [
              2.7630615234375,
              7.8089631205594
            ],
            [
              2.7301025390625,
              7.9177933526279
            ],
            [
              2.8179931640625,
              8.157118149072
            ],
            [
              2.7301025390625,
              8.3745619854728
            ],
            [
              2.8179931640625,
              8.5918844057982
            ]
          ]
        ]
      }
    },
    {
      "type": "Feature",
      "properties": {},
      "geometry": {
        "type": "Point",
        "coordinates": [
          3.9715576171875004,
          7.264394325339779
        ]
      }
    }
  ]
}

Abacha oversaw the reorganisation of Nigeria into six geopolitical zones, in order to reflect cultural, economic, and political realities of the regions;

 North Central: Benue State, Kogi State, Kwara State, Nasarawa State, Niger State, Plateau State and Federal Capital Territory, Nigeria.
 North East: Adamawa State, Bauchi State, Borno State, Gombe State, Taraba State and Yobe State.
 North West: Jigawa State, Kaduna State, Kano State, Katsina State, Kebbi State, Sokoto State and Zamfara State.
 South East: Abia State, Anambra State, Ebonyi State, Enugu State and Imo State.
 South South: Akwa Ibom State, Bayelsa State, Cross River State, Delta State, Edo State and Rivers State.
 South West: Ekiti State, Lagos State, Ogun State, Ondo State, Osun State and Oyo State.

Abacha held a constitutional conference between 1993 to 1995. Early in 1998, Abacha announced that elections would be held on 1 August, with a view toward handing power to a civilian government on 1 October. It later became apparent that Abacha had no intention of relinquishing power. By April 1998, Abacha had coerced the country's five political parties into endorsing him as the sole presidential candidate.

Foreign policy 
In 1995, following the execution of Ken Saro-Wiwa, Nigeria was suspended from the Commonwealth of Nations. While hosting Nelson Mandela, Abacha admitted he was advised against interfering with Saro-Wiwa's trial—but made assurances that he would use his rank in government to commute the sentence if death sentence was pronounced. Justice Ibrahim Auta was the judge presiding over the proceedings, and sentenced Saro-Wiwa to death by hanging. Abacha did not commute the sentence.

In 1997, Muammar Gaddafi's West African Tour to Sani Abacha to mark the new Islamic year directly infringed United Nations Sanctions on Libya, yet he was greeted by thousands of Abacha's supporters who came out to demonstrate their loyalty in Kano. The Libyan leader made no commitments to Nigeria but merely sought to strengthen relations with the country, many saw the visit as a way to strengthen his agenda of Pan-Africanism.

Abacha intervened in the Liberian Civil War. Through the Economic Community of West African States Monitoring Group, Abacha sent troops to Liberia to fight against the rising insurgency in the country and political tensions. The Civil War, which began in 1989, saw an influx of Nigerian troops from 1990 when Abacha was defence minister.

Despite being repeatedly condemned by the US State Department, Abacha did have a few ties to American politics. In 1997, Senator James Inhofe (R-Oklahoma) travelled to Nigeria to meet with Abacha as a representative of the "Family", a group of evangelical Christian politicians and civic leaders. Abacha and the Family had a business and political relationship from that point until his death.  Abacha also developed ties with other American political figures such as Senator Carol Moseley Braun (D-Illinois) Rev. Jesse Jackson and Minister Louis Farrakhan. Several African American political leaders visited Nigeria during his reign and Farrakhan supported his administration.

Death 
On 8 June 1998, Abacha died in the Aso Rock Presidential Villa in Abuja. He was buried on the same day according to Muslim tradition and without an autopsy, fueling speculation that he may have been assassinated. The government identified the cause of death as a sudden heart attack. It is believed by foreign diplomats, including United States Intelligence analysts, that he may have been poisoned. His chief security officer, Hamza al-Mustapha, believed he was poisoned by Israeli operatives in the company of Yasser Arafat. At his death, he was about to transfer power to a civilian government in October 1998, implemented in October 1995. 

After Abacha's death, General Abdulsalami Abubakar became head of state, whose short tenure ushered the Fourth Nigerian Republic into existence.

Personal life 
Abacha was married to Maryam Abacha and had seven sons and three daughters, he became a grandfather posthumously; as of 2018 he had thirty-three grandchildren.

See also
List of unsolved deaths

References

External links

 
 
 Abacha dies at 54, BBC News, 8 June 1998

1943 births
1998 deaths
20th-century Nigerian politicians
Sani
Chiefs of Army Staff (Nigeria)
Defence ministers of Nigeria
Heads of state of Nigeria
Graduates of the Mons Officer Cadet School
Kanuri people
Leaders who took power by coup
Nigerian Army officers
Nigerian generals
Nigerian Muslims
Participants in the 1966 Nigerian counter-coup
Participants in the 1983 Nigerian military coup
Participants in the August 1985 Nigerian military coup
People from Kano
Rumfa College alumni
Unsolved deaths